Bishopanthus is a monotypic genus of flowering plants in the family Asteraceae, containing the single species Bishopanthus soliceps. It is endemic to Peru.

References

Liabeae
Monotypic Asteraceae genera
Endemic flora of Peru